American Airlines Flight 293 was a regularly scheduled flight which was hijacked by Nikola Kavaja, a Serbian nationalist and anti-communist, on June 20, 1979. During the hijacking Kavaja demanded and received another airplane with the intent of crashing it into the headquarters of the Yugoslav Communist Party.

Background

Nikola Kavaja was one of six Serbs convicted of the May 1979 bombing of a Yugoslav consul’s home in Chicago. On June 20, 1979, Kavaja, already released on bail, took over the Boeing 727 shortly before it landed in Chicago from New York by threatening the pilots with a homemade bomb. He demanded the release of Stojilko Kajevich, a Serbian Orthodox priest and accomplice in the consul home bombing who remained in jail. After letting the passengers and most of the crew members go, Kavaja forced what was left of the crew to fly back to New York City, where he demanded and received a Boeing 707 to fly him initially to Johannesburg, South Africa, but later to Ireland after learning from his lawyer that Ireland did not have an extradition treaty with the United States. After arriving at Shannon Airport he planned to take control of the airplane and fly it to Belgrade where he would crash it into the headquarters of the Yugoslav Communist Party; however, after being persuaded by his lawyer, who was also on board, to not do so, he surrendered to the Irish authorities, who then turned him over to the Americans. Kavaja was sentenced to 67 years in an American prison, but served only 20 years.  Kavaja died from a heart attack at his home in Belgrade in November 2008.

Kavaja later claimed in numerous interviews with Serbian newspapers that Osama bin Laden stole his idea of crashing airplanes into tall buildings in the September 11, 2001 attacks.

References 

Aircraft hijackings in the United States
Accidents and incidents involving the Boeing 727
Accidents and incidents involving the Boeing 707
293
Aviation accidents and incidents in the United States in 1979
Terrorist incidents in Europe in 1979
Nationalist terrorism in Europe
Aircraft hijackings in Ireland
Aircraft hijackings
Failed terrorist attempts in Europe
June 1979 events in Europe
Terrorist incidents in the Republic of Ireland
Terrorist incidents in the Republic of Ireland in the 1970s